Mutual Needs is a 1997 American erotic thriller drama film directed by Robert Angelo. The film's music was composed by Bill Rogers. The film starring Eric Scott Woods, Tricia Lee Pascoe, Karl Bury, Laura Rogers, Rochelle Swanson and Kimberly Kelley in the lead roles.

Cast
 Eric Scott Woods as Michael
 Tricia Lee Pascoe as Sandra
 Karl Bury as Pete
 Laura Rogers as Helen
 Rochelle Swanson as Charlene
 Sydney Coale as Josie
 Kimberly Kelley as Kelly
 David Andriole as Bartender
 Richard Grieco as Brandon Collier
 Charlotte Lewis as Louise Collier
 Dee Wallace as Patricia
 Christopher Atkins as Andrew
 Kristen Williams as Kimberly
 Karen Moore as Rita

References

External links
 
 

1997 films
1990s thriller drama films
American thriller drama films
1997 drama films
1990s English-language films
1990s American films